The Stymphalian birds (Modern transliteration Stymfalídes Órnithes) are a group of voracious birds in Greek mythology. The birds' appellation is derived from their dwelling in a swamp in Stymphalia.

Characteristics 
The Stymphalian birds are man-eating birds with beaks of bronze, sharp metallic feathers they could launch at their victims, and poisonous dung.

Mythology

These birds were pets of Artemis, the goddess of the hunt; or had been brought up by Ares, the god of war. They migrated to a marsh in Arcadia to escape a pack of wolves. There they bred quickly and swarmed over the countryside, destroying crops, fruit trees, and townspeople.

The Sixth Labour of Heracles
The Stymphalian birds were defeated by Heracles (Hercules) in his sixth labour for Eurystheus. Heracles could not go into the marsh to reach the nests of the birds, as the ground would not support his weight. Athena, noticing the hero's plight, gave Heracles a rattle called  krotala, which Hephaestus had made especially for the occasion. Heracles shook the krotala (similar to castanets) on a certain mountain that overhung the lake and thus frightening the birds into the air. Heracles then shot many of them with feathered arrows tipped with poisonous blood from the slain Hydra. In some versions of this story this labour was discounted because of the help of Athena. The rest flew far away, never to plague Arcadia again. Heracles brought some of the slain birds to Eurystheus as proof of his success.

The surviving birds made a new home on the island of Aretias in the Euxine Sea. The Argonauts later encountered them there.

According to Mnaseas, they were not birds, but women and daughters of Stymphalus and Ornis, and were killed by Heracles because they did not receive him hospitably. In the temple of the Stymphalian Artemis, however, they were represented as birds, and behind the temple, there were white marble statues of maidens with birds' feet.

Classical literature sources 
Chronological listing of the main classical literature sources for the Stymphalian birds (not comprehensive):

 Sophocles, The Philoctetes, 1092 ff with the Scholiast (trans. Jebb) (Greek tragedy 5th century BC)
Regarding the Sophocles source, Jebb says Brunck reads "πτωκάδες" as "πλωάδες" which is an epithet given by Apollonius Rhodius to the Stymphalian birds in Argonautica 2. 1054.

 Apollonius Rhodius, Argonautica 2. 1054 ff (trans. Coleridge) (Greek epic poetry 3rd century BC)
 Mnaseas, Scholiast on Apoll. Rhod. 2.1054 (trans Mehler) (Greek history 3rd century BC)
 Diodorus Siculus, Library of History 3. 30. 4 (trans. Oldfather) (Greek history 1st century BC)
 Diodorus Siculus, Library of History 4. 13. 2
 Lucretius, Of The Nature of Things 5. Proem 1 (trans. Leonard) (Roman philosophy 1st century BC)
 Ovid, Metamorphoses 9. 187 ff (trans. Miller) (Roman epic poetry 1st century BC to 1st century AD)
 Strabo, Geography 8. 6. 8 (trans. Jones) (Greek geography 1st century BC to 1st century AD)
 Philippus of Thessalonica, The Twelve Labors of Hercules (The Greek Classics ed. Miller Vol 3 1909 p. 397) (Greek epigram 1st century AD)
 Seneca, Hercules Furens 243 ff (trans. Miller) (Roman tragedy 1st century AD)
 Seneca, Medea 771 ff  (trans. Miller)
 Seneca, Phoenissae 420 ff  (trans. Miller)
 Seneca, Hercules Oetaeus 17–30 (trans. Miller).  (Roman tragedy 1st century AD)
 Seneca, Hercules Oetaeus 1237 ff
 Seneca, Hercules Oetaeus 1813 ff
 Statius, Thebaid 4. 100 ff (trans. Mozley) (Roman epic poetry 1st century AD)
 Statius, Thebaid 4. 292 ff
 Plutarch, Moralia, On the Fortune of Alexander, 341. 11 ff (trans. Babbitt) (Greek philosophy 1st century AD to 2nd century AD)
 Pseudo-Apollodorus, The Library 2. 5. 6 (trans. Frazer) (Greek mythography 2nd century AD)
 Pausanias, Description of Greece 5. 10. 9 (trans. Frazer) (Greek travelogue 2nd century AD)
 Pausanias, Description of Greece 8. 22. 4–5
 Pseudo-Hyginus, Fabulae 20 (trans. Grant) (Roman mythography 2nd century AD)
 Pseudo-Hyginus, Fabulae 30
 Quintus Smyrnaeus, Fall of Troy 6. 227 ff (trans. Way) (Greek epic poetry 4th century AD)
 Servius, In Vergilii Carmina Commentarii 8. 299 (trans. Thilo) (Greek commentary 4th century AD to 5th century AD)
 Nonnos, Dionysiaca 25. 242 ff (trans. Rouse) (Greek epic poetry 5th century AD)
 Nonnos Dionysiaca 29. 237 ff
 Boethius, The Consolation of Philosophy 4. 7. 13 ff (trans. Rand & Stewart) (Roman philosophy 6th century AD)
 Tzetzes, Chiliades or Book of Histories 2. 291 ff (trans. Untila et al.) (Greco-Byzantine history 12 century AD)
 Tzetzes, Chiliades or Book of Histories 2. 496 ff

In popular culture
Stymphalian birds are featured as new monsters in the Dungeon magazine adventure "The Chest of the Aloeids".
 In the 2003 real-time strategy game Age of Mythology: The Titans, the birds are available as flying units for the Atlantean culture.
Stymphalian birds appear in several of Rick Riordan's Camp Half-Blood Chronicles books, particularly The Sea of Monsters where they are defeated by archers after being distracted by a boombox playing Dean Martin's "Volare."
Stymphalian birds are depicted on one of the Steyr AUG skins from the computer game Counter-Strike: Global Offensive.

Gallery

See also
 Hercules Killing the Stymphalian Birds
 Stymphalian Birds (Savva)

Citations

General sources 
 "Greece: I Ancient”, in The New Grove's Dictionary of Music and Musicians, London 2001, vol. 10, pp. 344–34

External links 
 

Greek legendary creatures
Labours of Hercules
Legendary birds